Besmaya Range Complex is a joint base controlled by the Iraqi Armed Forces.

References

Installations of the United States Army in Iraq
Army installations of Iraq
Military installations established in 2007